William Virgin may refer to:
 William John Virgin, Indian Medical Service officer and principal of Dhaka Medical College
 William Wirt Virgin, American politician and jurist from Maine